Equal Treatment Directive 2006 (2006/54/EC) is a legal act of European Union law, which implements the principle of equal treatment between men and women in EU labour law.

Background
Since the Treaty of Amsterdam came into force in 1999, new EU laws, or Directives, have been enacted in the area of anti-discrimination. The Equal Treatment Directive 2006/54/EC is a consolidation of previous Directives in this area, notably, the Directive 76/207/EEC, which was amended by Directive 2002/73/EC.

See also

Anti-discrimination law
Directive 76/207/EEC
EU labour law
List of European Union directives
UK labour law

Notes

References

External links
Text of the Directive
European Commission Combatting Discrimination

2006 in law
2006 in the European Union
Anti-discrimination law in the European Union
Equal pay for equal work
European Union employment directives
International relations